Pope Gabriel V of Alexandria, was the 88th Pope of Alexandria and Patriarch of the See of St. Mark.

Pope Gabriel was named by his predecessor Matthew I, before his death, hence he was selected for the papacy.

References

15th-century Coptic Orthodox popes of Alexandria
1427 deaths